Erna (Ernestine) Patak (4 November 1871 – 19 April 1955) was an Austrian Zionist, social worker, women's activist and politician. In the early 1920s, she became the first president of the Austrian branch of the Women's International Zionist Organization. In 1942, she was sent to the Theresienstadt concentration camp but was able to survive and returned to Vienna in 1945. She later immigrated to Israel.

References

1871 births
1955 deaths
Politicians from Vienna
Jewish activists
Jewish feminists
Austrian Zionists
Austrian women's rights activists
Austrian social workers
Austrian emigrants to Israel
Theresienstadt Ghetto prisoners